Marek Wisła (13 September 1957, Czechowice-Dziedzice – 29 January 2018) was a Polish sprint canoer who competed in the early 1980s. At the 1980 Summer Olympics in Moscow, he finished fourth in the C-2 500 m event.

References

Sports-Reference.com profile

1957 births
2018 deaths
Canoeists at the 1980 Summer Olympics
Olympic canoeists of Poland
Polish male canoeists
People from Czechowice-Dziedzice
Sportspeople from Silesian Voivodeship